The 1959 PGA Championship was the 41st PGA Championship played from July 30 to August 2 at Minneapolis Golf Club in St. Louis Park, Minnesota, a suburb west of Minneapolis.

Six strokes back at the start of the final round, Bob Rosburg shot a 66 (−4) to win his only major championship at  one stroke ahead of runners-up Jerry Barber and Doug Sanders.  Rosburg had managed only five birdies in the first three rounds, but had five in the first nine on Sunday to go out in 30, then a record. Barber shot a 65 on Friday and was the 36-hole and 54-hole leader at 205 (−5), with Sanders a stroke back. Barber won the title two years later, in a Monday playoff in 1961. Tied for fourteenth at 286 (+6) was 

This was the second year of stroke play at the PGA Championship, a match play event through 1957. Daily admission was three dollars on Thursday and Friday, and five dollars per day on the weekend. The winner's share was increased fifty per cent to $8,250; two years earlier, it was $8,000 for the final match play competition.

The Open Championship was played several weeks earlier in Scotland at Muirfield; only four Americans (two amateurs) were in the field and none made the cut.

Round summaries

First round
Thursday, July 30, 1959

Source:

Second round
Friday, July 31, 1959

Source:

Third round
Saturday, August 1, 1959

Source:

Final round
Sunday, August 2, 1959

Source:

Scorecard
Final round

Cumulative tournament scores, relative to par

Source:

References

External links
PGA.com – 1959 PGA Championship

PGA Championship
Golf in Minnesota
PGA Championship
PGA Championship
PGA Championship
PGA Championship
PGA Championship